Jamie Romeo is an American politician from the state of New York. A Democrat, Romeo has served as Monroe County Clerk since 2020. She previously represented the 136th district in the New York State Assembly, covering parts of Rochester and its inner suburbs, from 2019 until 2020.

Career
While still obtaining her MPA at SUNY Brockport, Romeo began her political career working for the Democratic legislative office in Monroe County. Afterwards, she held positions as chief of staff for State Senator Ted O'Brien and executive director of the Monroe County Democratic Committee.

Electoral history
In 2018, after the death of U.S. Congresswoman Louise Slaughter, Assemblymen Joseph Morelle announced a run for her former congressional seat opening up the New York State Assembly seat in the 136th district that he occupied for the first time since 1990. Romeo ran for the seat, defeating two other candidates in the primary election and facing no opposition in the November general election. She took office on January 9, 2019.

After Monroe County Clerk Adam Bello was elected Monroe County Executive in 2019, Romeo announced her candidacy for his former office. On February 6, 2020, Governor Andrew Cuomo appointed her to the position in advance of the 2020 election.

Personal life
Romeo was born and raised in Irondequoit, where she continues to live with her son, Dominic.

References

Living people
People from Irondequoit, New York
Democratic Party members of the New York State Assembly
Women state legislators in New York (state)
21st-century American women politicians
21st-century American politicians
St. John Fisher College alumni
State University of New York at Brockport alumni
1980s births
Date of birth missing (living people)
County clerks in New York (state)